San Jose Earthquakes is a soccer team based in San Jose, California, that competes in Major League Soccer (MLS), the most senior soccer league in the United States. San Jose Earthquakes was established as the San Jose Clash in 1994 becoming a founding member of MLS where they competed starting in 1996. The team rebranded and changed their name in 2000 to San Jose Earthquakes, connecting them with the former professional team that played in San Jose from 1974 to 1988. The franchise was moved at the conclusion of the 2005 MLS season to Houston to become the Houston Dynamo, thus putting the team and its records on hiatus. The team was revived two years later as an MLS expansion franchise, beginning play in 2008.

In addition to the MLS season, San Jose also competes in the annual U.S. Open Cup tournament. Depending on the team's performance in these two competitions, they may also qualify for the MLS Cup Playoffs in the same year and the CONCACAF Champions League the following year. The CONCACAF Champions League winner qualifies for the next FIFA Club World Cup. The Earthquakes have won two MLS Cups and Supporters Shields apiece, but they have yet to win the Lamar Hunt U.S. Open Cup. Having won 4 trophies, San Jose is the eighth most successful MLS club and one of only three clubs to win the MLS Cup and Supporters Shield multiple times. The following list summarizes the Earthquakes' yearly performance in all competitive competitions.

Key
Key to competitions

 Major League Soccer (MLS) – The top-flight of soccer in the United States, established in 1996.
 U.S. Open Cup (USOC) – The premier knockout cup competition in US soccer, first contested in 1914.
 CONCACAF Champions League (CCL) – The premier competition in North American soccer since 1962. It went by the name of Champions' Cup until 2008.

Key to colors and symbols

Key to league record
 Season = The year and article of the season
 Div = Division/level on pyramid
 League = League name
 Pld = Games played
 W = Games won
 L = Games lost
 D = Games drawn
 GF = Goals for
 GA = Goals against
 GD = Goal difference
 Pts = Points
 PPG = Points per game
 Conf. = Conference position
 Overall = League position

Key to cup record
 DNE = Did not enter
 DNQ = Did not qualify
 NH = Competition not held or canceled
 QR = Qualifying round
 PR = Preliminary round
 GS = Group stage
 R1 = First round
 R2 = Second round
 R3 = Third round
 R4 = Fourth round
 R5 = Fifth round
 Ro16 = Round of 16
 QF = Quarter-finals
 SF = Semi-finals
 F = Final
 RU = Runners-up
 W = Winners

Seasons

1. Avg. attendance include statistics from league matches only.
2. Top goalscorer(s) includes all goals scored in League, MLS Cup Playoffs, U.S. Open Cup, MLS is Back Tournament, CONCACAF Champions League, FIFA Club World Cup, and other competitive continental matches.

References 

 
San Jose Earthquakes
San Jose Earthquakes seasons